Ayad al-Samarrai (born 1946) is a Sunni Arab Iraqi politician, who was the chairman of the Iraqi Accord Front parliamentary group, and since July 2011 is the Secretary-General of the Iraqi Islamic Party. He was elected as the Speaker of the Iraqi Parliament on April 19, 2009, and served until June 2010.

Early life
Samarrai was born in 1946 in the Adhamiyah district of Baghdad. He graduated in 1970 from the University of Baghdad with a Bachelor of Science from the Mechanical Engineering Department.

Exile

Samarrai lived in exile in Leeds Britain in 1995, when he was elected secretary-general of the party.

Prior to the 2003 Invasion of Iraq he was appointed to the American-backed opposition Follow-Up and Arrangement Committee.

Return to Iraq

In September 2006, he was appointed as a member/ second deputy chairman of parliamentary review committee considering amendments to the constitution of Iraq.

In July 2007, he was elected head of the Iraqi Accordance Front parliamentary group, replacing Adnan al-Dulaimi.

On 24 May 2009, he was elected as Deputy of the Iraqi Islamic Party.

References

Speakers of the Council of Representatives of Iraq
Iraqi Islamic Party politicians
Iraqi Accord Front politicians
University of Baghdad alumni
People from Baghdad
Iraqi Sunni Muslims
Living people
1946 births